Think of One is an album by jazz trumpeter Wynton Marsalis that was released in 1983. It won the Grammy Award for Best Jazz Instrumental Performance, Soloist.

The album peaked at number 102 on the Billboard 200 and number one on the Billboard Top Jazz Albums chart. It was ranked at number 8 among  "Albums of the Year" for 1983 by NME. The album takes its name from the Thelonious Monk composition "Think of One", which is performed on the album.

Track listing

Personnel
 Wynton Marsalis – trumpet, arranger, producer
 Branford Marsalis – soprano and tenor saxophones
 Kenny Kirkland – piano
 Phil Bowler – bass
 Ray Drummond – bass
 Jeff "Tain" Watts – drums
Technical
 George Butler – executive producer
 Tim Geelan – engineer
 Harry Spiridakis – assistant engineer
 Marc Cobrin – assistant engineer
 Stanley Crouch – liner notes

References

1983 albums
Albums produced by George Butler (record producer)
Columbia Records albums
Wynton Marsalis albums